A boot knife or a gambler's dagger is a small fixed-blade knife (usually, a dagger) that is designed to be carried in or on a boot.  Typically, such a knife is worn on a belt or under a pant leg. If worn around the neck (by means of a chain or lanyard) they become a neck knife. Boot knives generally come with a sheath that includes some form of a clip. Most have double-edged blades, like a dagger, that range from 3 to 5 inches (7.62 to 12.7 cm).

History

Legal issues
A boot-knife carries with it a multitude of legal issues, as each defining factor is likely to cause legal trouble in certain jurisdictions. Some regions prohibit carrying fixed-blade knives, double edged knives (dirk or dagger), concealed knives, or knives over certain length.

Manufacturers
Boot knives have been made by companies such as Blackjack Knives, Ek Knives, Valor Cutlery, Gerber Legendary Blades, Kershaw Knives, Parker Bros., and Cold Steel.

References

Daggers